Diyora Erkinova (born 1 December 2002) is an Uzbekistani footballer who plays as a midfielder. She has been a member of the Uzbekistan women's national team.

International goals
Scores and results list Uzbekistan's goal tally first

See also
List of Uzbekistan women's international footballers

References 

2002 births
Living people
Uzbekistani women's footballers
Uzbekistan women's international footballers
Women's association football midfielders
People from Tashkent Region
21st-century Uzbekistani women